A wedlease is a proposed type of marital contract in which two spouses agree to a marriage of limited duration for a set period of time with renewal options.

The concept and term were introduced by a 2013 opinion piece in The Washington Post. It has since been discussed in numerous other publications. In 2011, lawmakers of Mexico City proposed introducing marriage contracts that lasted two years in order to assess compatibility and cut divorce rates.

See also

 Handfasting (Neopaganism)
 Marriage of convenience
 Nikah Misyar, in Sunni Islam
 Nikah mut‘ah, in Shia Islam
 Probationary marriage in Scotland
 
 Sponsalia de futuro
 Types of marriages

References

Living arrangements
Temporary marriages